Myrmecia cephalotes is an Australian ant which belongs to the genus Myrmecia. This species is native to Australia. Myrmecia cephalotes has a large distribution in central South Australia and can be found in other regions of Australia.

The length of a worker Myrmecia cephalotes is 13–14.5 millimetres long. The head and gaster are black; the antennae, thorax, node, legs and other features on the body are a yellowish-red colour. The mandibles are a yellow colour.

References

Myrmeciinae
Hymenoptera of Australia
Insects described in 1943
Insects of Australia